Michael Eric Butler (born September 13, 1984 in Pascagoula, Mississippi) is a former American football tight end. He was signed by the New York Giants as an undrafted free agent in 2008. He played college football at Mississippi State.

Butler has also been a member of the Indianapolis Colts and St. Louis Rams.

College career
Butler played in 45 games with 23 starts in four years at tight end for Mississippi State and recorded 50 receptions for 635 yards (12.7-yard avg.) and eight touchdowns. As a senior, played in 13 games with five starts and caught eight passes for 71 yards. He became MSU’s career touchdown leader for a tight end as a sophomore. He became Bulldogs’ single-season touchdown receptions leader for a tight end as a freshman. Butler was named to the SEC All-Freshman and The Sporting News 2004 Freshman All-SEC team.

Professional career

New York Giants
After going undrafted in the 2008 NFL Draft, Butler signed with the New York Giants as an undrafted free agent on April 29, 2008. He was waived by the team during final cuts on August 30.

Indianapolis Colts
Butler was signed to the practice squad of the Indianapolis Colts on November 14, 2008. He was released by the Colts on November 19.

St. Louis Rams
Butler was signed by the St. Louis Rams on March 16, 2009. He was waived on November 29. He was re-signed to the practice squad on December 3, 2009. He signed again with the St. Louis Rams on January 13, 2010.

Oakland Raiders
Butler signed with the Oakland Raiders on August 20, 2010. He was released on August 31.

References

External links
Indianapolis Colts bio
Mississippi State Bulldogs bio
New York Giants bio
St. Louis Rams bio

1984 births
Living people
People from Pascagoula, Mississippi
Players of American football from Mississippi
American football tight ends
Mississippi State Bulldogs football players
New York Giants players
Indianapolis Colts players
St. Louis Rams players
Oakland Raiders players